Ralph Wright (3 August 1947 – 7 June 2020) was an English professional footballer who played as a defender and midfielder. Active in England and the United States, Wright made over 200 appearances in an 8-year career.

Career
Born in Newcastle, Wright played professionally in England and the United States for Spennymoor United, Norwich City, Bradford Park Avenue, Hartlepool United, Stockport County, Bolton Wanderers, Southport, the New York Cosmos, the Miami Toros and the Dallas Tornado.

Wright died on 7 June 2020.

References

1947 births
2020 deaths
English footballers
English expatriate footballers
Expatriate soccer players in the United States
English expatriate sportspeople in the United States
Spennymoor United F.C. players
Norwich City F.C. players
Bradford (Park Avenue) A.F.C. players
Hartlepool United F.C. players
Stockport County F.C. players
Bolton Wanderers F.C. players
Southport F.C. players
New York Cosmos players
Miami Toros players
Dallas Tornado players
English Football League players
North American Soccer League (1968–1984) players
North American Soccer League (1968–1984) indoor players
Association football defenders
Association football midfielders